New Kent is a census-designated place (CDP) in and the county seat of New Kent County, Virginia, United States. The population as of the 2020 Census was 739.

Cumberland Landing, Cumberland Plantation, and the Cumberland Marsh Natural Area Preserve are near New Kent.

Criss Cross and St. Peter's Church are listed on the National Register of Historic Places, and New Kent High School and George W. Watkins High School are National Historic Landmarks.

Notable people

 Jamion Christian, former Head Coach, Men’s Basketball, George Washington University (DC).
 Jarrell Christian, Head Coach, Maine Celtics.
 Letitia Christian Tyler, the first wife of President John Tyler and first lady of the United States from 1841 to 1842.
 Martha Washington, George Washington’s wife 1st First Lady of the United States of America.

Demographics

2020 census

Note: the US Census treats Hispanic/Latino as an ethnic category. This table excludes Latinos from the racial categories and assigns them to a separate category. Hispanics/Latinos can be of any race.

See also
 New Kent High School
 New Kent High School and George W. Watkins High School

References

Unincorporated communities in Virginia
Census-designated places in New Kent County, Virginia
County seats in Virginia
Census-designated places in Virginia